The 1921 Millsaps Majors football team was an American football team that represented Millsaps College the Southern Intercollegiate Athletic Association (SIAA) in the 1921 college football season. Led by Ewing Y. Freeland in his first and only season as head coach, the team compiled an overall record of 1–5–1  with a mark of 0–3 in SIAA play.

Schedule

References

Millsaps
Millsaps Majors football seasons
Millsaps Majors football